Peter Weller (born June 24, 1947) is an American film and stage actor, television director, and art historian.

He has appeared in more than 70 films and television series, including RoboCop (1987) and its sequel RoboCop 2 (1990), in which he played the title character; The Adventures of Buckaroo Banzai Across the 8th Dimension (1984); and Star Trek Into Darkness (2013). He appeared in such films as Woody Allen's Mighty Aphrodite (1995), the Oliver Stone-produced The New Age (1994), and David Cronenberg's adaptation of William Burroughs's novel Naked Lunch (1991).

In addition to a Saturn Award nomination for his RoboCop role, he received an Academy Award nomination for his 1993 short Partners, in which he also acted. In television, he hosted the program Engineering an Empire on the History Channel from 2005 to 2007. He played Christopher Henderson in the fifth season of 24,  Stan Liddy in the fifth season of the Showtime original series Dexter, and Charles "Charlie" Barosky in 11 episodes in the sixth season of Sons of Anarchy. From 2012 to 2017, he was involved in the A&E (now Netflix) series Longmire as a director and actor. In 2017, he appeared on The Last Ship as Dr. Paul Vellek.

He holds a Ph.D. in Italian Renaissance Art History from UCLA.

Early life
Weller was born June 24, 1947, in Stevens Point, Wisconsin, the son of Dorothy Jean ( Davidson; 1924–2002), a homemaker, and Frederick Bradford Weller (1922–1986), a lawyer, federal judge, and career helicopter pilot for the United States Army. Weller had a "middle-class Catholic" upbringing and is of English, German, French and Irish descent. As a result of his father's army work, Weller spent many years abroad during his childhood. His family lived in West Germany for several years before eventually moving to Texas, where he attended Alamo Heights High School in San Antonio, graduating in 1965.

Education
While enrolled at North Texas State University (now the University of North Texas), he played trumpet in one of the campus bands. He graduated with a Bachelor of Arts degree in Theatre]l in 1969, and began his acting career after attending the American Academy of Dramatic Arts (Class of 1972).

In 2004, Weller completed a Master of Arts degree in Roman and Renaissance Art at Syracuse University, and occasionally taught courses in ancient history at the university. In 2007, he began a Ph.D. at UCLA in Italian Renaissance Art History. In October 2013 he filed his dissertation, "Alberti Before Florence: Early Sources Informing Leon Battista Alberti’s De pictura", and was awarded his doctorate in 2014.

Career

Stage
Weller's stage career began in the 1970s with appearances on Broadway in Full Circle, directed by Otto Preminger, and Summer Brave, William Inge's rewrite of his play Picnic. About this time, he became a member of the Actors Studio.

In December 2006, Weller starred as architect Frank Lloyd Wright at Chicago's Goodman Theatre in Frank's Home, a new play by Richard Nelson.

Film
Weller appeared in the 1984 film Firstborn with Corey Haim, where he played the abusive boyfriend of Haim's mother (played by Teri Garr).

Weller has appeared in more than 50 films and television series, including turns as the title characters in The Adventures of Buckaroo Banzai Across the 8th Dimension, and blockbuster hits RoboCop and RoboCop 2, he portrayed Starfleet Admiral Alexander Marcus in Star Trek Into Darkness in 2013. He has appeared in such critically acclaimed films as Woody Allen's Mighty Aphrodite, the Oliver Stone-produced The New Age and David Cronenberg's movie of William Burroughs's novel Naked Lunch.

In 1995, he appeared in Screamers, a science-fiction film based on the short story "Second Variety" by Philip K. Dick and directed by Christian Duguay.

Television
In a 1977 episode of the television series Lou Grant, he played Donald Sterner/Stryker, a tragically disillusioned Jewish-American Neo-Nazi leader who later committed suicide off-screen when his heritage was discovered.

On television, he played the shuttle captain in the short-lived series Odyssey 5 and made guest appearances as Terran supremacist John Frederick Paxton in the Star Trek: Enterprise episodes "Demons", "Terra Prime" and in Fringe as the character Alistair Peck.

Weller was a contributor to the History Channel in several productions, particularly as the host for the series Engineering an Empire. He was credited as "Peter Weller, Syracuse University", where he was an adjunct faculty member. He was later a graduate student in art history at UCLA, focusing on the Italian Renaissance.

In 2005, Weller co-starred as the Captain in a made-for-television remake of The Poseidon Adventure.

In 2006, Weller joined the cast of 24 as terrorist collaborator Christopher Henderson. Weller received a "cheer" in TV Guide'''s "Cheers & Jeers" section for his performance.

On January 15, 2010, Weller appeared in a teaser trailer for the companion documentary God of War: Unearthing the Legend that was featured in the game God of War III which Weller also hosted.

On April 15, 2010, Weller guest-starred in an episode of the science fiction drama Fringe. He guest-starred on the Showtime original series Dexter, and had a guest appearance in the December 22, 2010 episode of Psych where he played villain "Yin".

Since 2012, he is appearing in a recurring role as Lucien Connally on the crime drama television series Longmire.

In 2013, he played the part of the villain in the remake of the "Hookman" episode of the original Hawaii Five-O. The part was originally played in 1973 by J. J. Armes. In seasons six and seven of Sons of Anarchy, he plays the ruthless ex-cop Charles Barosky, a boss at the Stockton port and has dealings with the SAMCRO motorcycle club.

In 2017, Weller began appearing as Dr. Paul Vellek, a scientist, on The Last Ship.

Directing
Weller has directed various projects for television, including episodes of Homicide: Life on the Street, Monk and three episodes of Odyssey 5. He directed a 1997 adaptation of Elmore Leonard's Gold Coast starring David Caruso and Marg Helgenberger after previously starring in a version of Leonard's thriller Cat Chaser. He has directed eleven episodes of the series Sons of Anarchy, two in season 4, titled "Dorylus" and "Hands", three in season 5, titled "Authority Vested", "Toad's Wild Ride" and "Darthy", three in season 6, titled "One One Six", "Los Fantasmas" and "Aon Rud Pearsanta", and three in season 7, titled "Some Strange Eruption", "What a Piece of Work Is Man" and "Suits of Woe". He has directed one episode each season of Longmire since 2012.

Since 2018, Weller has directed episodes "Guts + Fuel + Hope" and "Banh Bao + Sterno + Drill + Burner + Mason" of MacGyver, and episodes "Cry Murder" and "Whispers of Death" of Magnum P.I..

Voice acting
Weller voiced the character of Bruce Wayne / Batman in the two-part 2012–13 animated adaptation of The Dark Knight Returns, and the titular character in the video game Wilson's Heart. He returned to voice RoboCop in a series of commercials for KFC in 2019 and Mortal Kombat 11.

Personal life
In 1980, Weller met Ali MacGraw, during the making of Just Tell Me What You Want. They had an on-off relationship for several years.

On June 24, 2006, on his 59th birthday, Weller married his longtime girlfriend, actress Shari Stowe, at the Santa Maria Assunta church in Positano, Italy.  Among the guests attending the wedding were Carrie Fisher and Marg Helgenberger.

Awards and nominations
 (1988) Saturn Award for Best Actor – RoboCop (Nominated)
 (1992) Genie Award for Best Performance by an Actor in a Leading Role – Naked Lunch (Nominated)
 (1994) Academy Award for Best Live Action Short Film – Partners (Nominated)
 (2002) Independent Spirit Award for Best Supporting Male  – Ivans XTC (Nominated)

Filmography
Feature film

Television film

Television series

Video games

References

External links
 
 
 
 
 
 History Channel's Engineering an Empire site
 "RoboCop in Rome!" New York Daily News "RoboCop, PhD" Wired News "RoboCop speaks to Detroit" Funny Or Die''

Living people
20th-century American male actors
21st-century American male actors
Alamo Heights High School alumni
American Academy of Dramatic Arts alumni
American male film actors
American male television actors
American people of English descent
American people of French descent
American people of German descent
American people of Irish descent
American television directors
Male actors from San Antonio
Male actors from Wisconsin
People from Stevens Point, Wisconsin
Syracuse University alumni
University of North Texas alumni
University of California, Los Angeles alumni
1947 births